In Fourier transform NMR spectroscopy and imaging, a pulse sequence describes a series of radio frequency pulses applied to the sample, such that the free induction decay is related to the characteristic frequencies of the desired signals. After applying a Fourier transform, the signal can be represented in the frequency domain as the NMR spectrum. In magnetic resonance imaging, additional gradient pulses are applied by switching magnetic fields that exhibit a space-dependent gradient which can be used to reconstruct spatially resolved images after applying Fourier transforms.

The outcome of pulse sequences is often analyzed using the product operator formalism.

See also 
 Spin echo
 Insensitive nuclei enhanced by polarization transfer
 MRI sequence

References

External links 
Pulse sequences in the online textbook
The Basics of NMR (by Joseph Hornak)

Nuclear magnetic resonance